Bourgogne is a former commune of the Marne department in northeastern France. On 1 January 2017, it was merged into the new commune Bourgogne-Fresne.

Geography
The commune is traversed by the Suippe river.

Population

See also
Communes of the Marne department

References

Former communes of Marne (department)
Marne communes articles needing translation from French Wikipedia